Lauren Hildebrandt is a pop singer from Scottsdale, Arizona best known for her single "Boy Shorts", released in March 2009 alongside her album Not Really a Waitress. She spent her youth training as a singer, dancer, actress and gymnast and was a cheerleader for Chaparral High School. She went to Arizona State University and majored in dance but longed for a mainstream pop career.  About two years into her studies, she had a dancing accident and was forced to take a medical leave of absence, and during this period she moved to Los Angeles where she started recording dance music.

Her debut single was titled "Burnin' Out," which hit #5 on the Billboard club play chart. The "Burnin' Out" video, directed by The Black Eyed Peas director Patricio Ginsela, helped establish her as one of the newcomers on the scene. Soon after, Lauren released the club song "Dance With You" and "My Life Again" in succession, and accompanying her album My Life Again.  Both dance singles went top 20 on the Billboard club charts, and Lauren continued to appear everywhere from Honolulu's famous Pipeline Café to clubs in New York and Miami. Signed to Red Wallet Records her album Not Really a Waitress is now in circulation with a much more pop-oriented sound than her previous dance album.

Discography
 My Life Again (2007)
 Not Really a Waitress (2009)

References

External links

 Lauren Hildebrandt official website 
 Interview in Chorus and Verse, by Michael Shinafelt, 9 July 2010

1982 births
Living people
21st-century American women singers
21st-century American singers
American women pop singers
Musicians from Scottsdale, Arizona
Singers from Arizona
Arizona State University alumni